Kiunga Urban LLG is a local-level government area situated in North Fly District of Western Province of Papua New Guinea. In the year 2000, the LLG had a population of 8265 people. The township of Kiunga, which is governed by this LLG is the government seat of the district.

Wards
81. Kiunga Urban

References

Local-level governments of Western Province (Papua New Guinea)